Wade Lee Rowdon (born September 7, 1960 in Riverhead, New York) is a retired Major League Baseball player who played from  to  with the Cincinnati Reds, Chicago Cubs and the Baltimore Orioles.

Rowdon attended Stetson University, where he was named team MVP in 1980. In 1980 and 1981, he played collegiate summer baseball for the Orleans Cardinals of the Cape Cod Baseball League, tying a league record with three homers in a single game, and being named the league's Outstanding Pro Prospect in 1981.

On June 9, 1987, Rowdon hit a home run in four consecutive at bats while playing for the Iowa Cubs.

References

External links

1960 births
Living people
Baseball players from New York (state)
Cincinnati Reds players
Chicago Cubs players
Baltimore Orioles players
Major League Baseball third basemen
Hiroshima Toyo Carp players
Stetson Hatters baseball players
Orleans Firebirds players
Appleton Foxes players
Denver Zephyrs players
Gulf Coast White Sox players
Iowa Cubs players
Rochester Red Wings players
Wichita Aeros players
American expatriate baseball players in Japan